A wolverine is a stocky and muscular carnivorous mammal that resembles a small bear.

Wolverine may also refer to:

Places

Canada
 Rural Municipality of Wolverine No. 340, Saskatchewan
 Wolverine Pass, a mountain pass in British Columbia
 Wolverine Range, a small mountain range in British Columbia
 Wolverine Formation, a geological formation in central Yukon

United States
 Wolverine, Kentucky, an unincorporated community
 Wolverine, Michigan, a village
 Michigan, the "Wolverine State", one of the United States
 Wolverine Canyon, near Boulder, Utah
 Wolverine Creek, a stream in Kansas
 Wolverine Hill, Ironwood, Michigan, a former ski jumping hill 
 Wolverine Mine, a mine (1882-1925) in Calumet Township, Michigan

People
 Wolverine, a ring name of professional wrestler Jeff Hardy
 Wolverine, nickname of Brazilian mixed martial artist Hugo Viana

Arts, entertainment, and media

Marvel Comics media
 Wolverine (character), a Marvel Comics character
 Wolverine (Ultimate Marvel character), Ultimate version of the character
 Old Man Logan, alternate future version of the character
 Logan (film series character), a primary protagonist of the X-Men film series
 X-23, a Marvel Comics character who also uses the name Wolverine
 Daken, another Marvel Comics character who has used the name Wolverine

Wolverine (comic book), featuring the Marvel Comics character
 Wolverine (video game), a 1991 video game
 The Wolverine (film), a 2013 film based on the Marvel Comics character
 X-Men Origins: Wolverine, a 2009 film based on the Marvel Comics character
 X-Men Origins: Wolverine (video game), a video game based on the 2009 film
 Wolverine (TV series), a 2011 anime tv series
 Logan (film), a 2017 film based on the Marvel Comics character
 Wolverine (podcast), a 2018-2019 audio drama
 Marvel's Wolverine (upcoming video game)

Other characters
 Wolverines, the teenagers' militia in the film Red Dawn and its 2012 reboot

Music 
 Wolverine (band), a Swedish progressive metal band
 The Wolverines (rock band), an Australian country rock band
 The Wolverines (jazz band) or Wolverines Orchestra, an American jazz band led by Bix Beiderbecke

Other uses in entertainment
 Wolverine, a Hasbro G.I. Joe toy vehicle
 The Wolverine is a 1921 American silent Western film

Brands and enterprises
 Whitney Wolverine, a lightweight, semiautomatic pistol
 Wolverine Hotel (Detroit), a former hotel in Detroit
 Wolverine World Wide, a manufacturer of work boots and leather products, including Wolverine brand boots

Sport 
 Canada national rugby league team, the national team for Canada in rugby league, nicknamed the Wolverines
 Detroit Wolverines (NFL), a professional football team that played in the 1928 season
 Detroit Wolverines, a Major League Baseball team in the 1880s, winners of the 1887 national championship
 Grove City College Wolverines
 Halifax Wolverines, a senior men's amateur ice hockey team based in Halifax, Nova Scotia, Canada, winners of the 1935 Allan Cup
 Halifax Wolverines, original name of the Bridgewater Lumberjacks, a Junior "A" ice hockey team now based in Bridgewater, Nova Scotia, Canada
 Helsinki Wolverines, a Finnish American-football team
 Michigan Wolverines, the sports teams of the University of Michigan
 Lancashire Wolverines, a British American-football team based in Blackburn, England
 Mount Carmel Wolverines, a professional football team based in Mount Carmel, Pennsylvania, that played in 1926
 Utah Valley Wolverines, the athletic teams of Utah Valley University
 Waywayseecappo Wolverines, a Junior "A" ice hockey team based in Waywayseecappo, Manitoba, Canada
 Whitecourt Wolverines, a Junior "A" ice hockey team based in Whitecourt
 Whitecourt Wolverines (2008–2012), a former Junior "B" ice hockey team based in Whitecourt, Alberta, Canada
 Wolverine Open, an LPGA Tour golf tournament played intermittently from 1955 to 1963 in the Detroit area

Transportation

Civilian transport 
 Wolverine (automobile), a car brand (1927-1928); see List of automobile manufacturers of the United States
 Wolverine (automobile company), a car made by the Reid Manufacturing Company of Detroit from 1904-1905
 Wolverine (motor vessel) (built 1908), which operated in Oregon and California, United States
 Wolverine (Amtrak train), a service that runs between Chicago and Pontiac, Michigan, United States
 Wolverine (NYC train), a New York Central train the ran between New York and Chicago via Southwestern Ontario
 Washington T-411 Wolverine, an American homebuilt aircraft design
 Wolverine Air, a charter airline based in the Northwest Territories, Canada

Military vehicles 
 AT-6B Wolverine, an armed variant of the Beechcraft T-6 Texan II trainer aircraft
 HMS Wolverine, six ships of the Royal Navy to bear the name
 KTO Rosomak (Polish: Wheeled Armored Vehicle "Wolverine"), a Polish 8x8 multi-role military vehicle 
 M10 tank destroyer, often known by the unofficial post-war name "Wolverine".
 M104 Wolverine, a bridge-laying vehicle
 USS Wolverine, two United States Navy vessels

Other uses 
 .277 Wolverine, a wildcat rifle cartridge based on the 5.56×45mm NATO case
 Wolverine, codename for TCP/IP Stack for Windows for Workgroups 3.11
 Michigan Brigade, also called the Wolverines, a cavalry unit commanded by George Armstrong Custer during the American Civil War

See also
 Wolverine 1 (disambiguation)
 Wolverine 2 (disambiguation)